The Woodville Football Club (SAFA) originally known as the Port Suburban Football Club (from 1868–1870) was an Australian rules football club that participated in the foundation year of the South Australian Football Association. It is not related to the Woodville Football Club that joined the SANFL in 1964.

First game 
The first game was played on the 16 May 1868 between sides representing the Woodville Cricket Club against those from the Port Suburban Cricket Club.

Port Road matches 
In 1869 the club referred to itself as 'Port Suburban' and played its games at Woodville with teams chosen by which side of Port Road they lived.

Rename as Port Adelaide formed 
The club changed its name from Port Suburban to "The Woodvilles" at a meeting held at the Ford's Hotel on Wednesday 11 May 1870. J. Hart was elected Captained.

SAFA foundation club 
Woodville following an internal match elected two delegates (Captain J.Obsorne and T. Letchford) to the inaugural meeting of the SAFA.

Woodville participated in the inaugural 1877 SAFA season winning 5 of its 16 matches to finish 5th of 8 teams. Internal disputes lead to resignations and having to play junior players towards the end of the season.

Dissolution 
The club dissolved at the end of the season and a number of Woodville's leading players joined a new club called the Norwood Football Club.

Woodville's last scheduled game for September 15 against Port Adelaide at Woodville fell through due to a lack of players (their principal players being involved in a practice cricket match at Norwood).

Notable players of the Woodville Football Club in 1877 were Captain J.R. (Joe) Osborn (who would become Norwood's Inaugural Captain in 1878), George Giffen (who played for Norwood 1878-1885) and the brothers Fred Letchford (who played for Norwood 1878-1886) and Tom Letchford (who played for Norwood 1878-1881).

References

Former South Australian National Football League clubs
1868 establishments in Australia
1877 disestablishments in Australia